is a Japanese actress and singer. She began her career as a member of the girl group Sakurakko Club from 1991 to 1993, wherein she formed the duo Key West Club with member Keiko Azuma. 

Nakatani focused on acting after her departure, making her debut on the popular television drama Under One Roof. She relaunched her music career under the tutelage of producer Ryuichi Sakamoto in 1996, releasing three albums: Shokumotsu Rensa (1996), Cure (1997) and Shiseikatsu (1999). Her best known songs include "Mind Circus" and "Suna no Kajitsu", which peaked at number ten on the Oricon charts.

As an actress, Nakatani has received six Japan Academy Awards for her roles in When the Last Sword Is Drawn (2002), Memories of Matsuko (2006), and Zero Focus (2009), among others. She is most known internationally for her role as Mai Takano in the Japanese horror film franchise Ring.

Biography
From 1998 to 1999, Nakatani starred in a trio of horror films – Ring, Rasen, and Ring 2 – followed by a lead role in Hideo Nakata's Chaos in 2000. That same year, she reprised her television role as Jun Shibata in the mystery film Keizoku.

In 2005, she co-starred in Kiyoshi Kurosawa's horror film Loft with Etsushi Toyokawa, and portrayed the love interest Hermes in Densha Otoko.

For her performance in the title role of Matsuko Kawajiri in Tetsuya Nakashima's 2006 film Memories of Matsuko, she won the Best Actress award at the 31st Hochi Film Award, the Asian Film Award for Best Actress, and the Japan Academy Prize for Outstanding Performance by an Actress in a Leading Role.

Nakatani appeared in François Girard's Silk. She co-starred in Isshin Inudo's Zero Focus with Ryōko Hirosue and Tae Kimura. 

As a musician, she collaborated several times with famed composer Ryuichi Sakamoto from 1996 to 2001.

As a spokesperson and model, she has appeared in several promotion campaigns, including over 70 television commercials for Ito En's Oi Ocha green tea. Nakatani speaks Japanese, French, and English.

In 2018, Nakatani announced her marriage to German musician Thilo Fechner, a viola player with the Vienna Philharmonic.

Filmography

Film
 Berlin (1995) – Kyoko
 Daishitsuren (1995)
 Ring (1998) – Mai Takano
 Rasen (1998) – Mai Takano
 Ring 2 (1999) – Mai Takano
 Chaos (2000) – Satomi Tsushima
 Keizoku (2000) – Jun Shibata
 When the Last Sword Is Drawn (2003) – Nui
 River of First Love (2004) – Satuki Kato
 The Hotel Venus (2004) – Wife
 Rikidozan (2004) – Aya
 Thirty Lies or So (2004) – Takarada
 Train Man (2005) – Hermes
 Loft (2005) – Reiko Hatuna
 Dead Run (2005) – Akane
 Memories of Matsuko (2006) – Matsuko Kawajiri
 Christmas on 24 July Avenue (2006) – Sayuri Honda
 Silk (2007) – Madame Blanche
 Happy Ever After (2007) – Yukie Morita
 Flavor of Happiness (2008) – Takako Yamashita
 Zero Focus (2009) – Sachiko
 Sweet Little Lies (2010)
 Hankyu Railways: A 15-Minute Miracle (2011) – Shoko
 Genji Monogatari: Sennen no Nazo (2011) – Shikibu Murasaki
 Himawari & Puppy's Seven Days (2013)
 Real (2013) – Eiko Aihara
 The Kiyosu Conference (2013) – Nene
 Ask This of Rikyu (2013) – Souon
 The World of Kanako (2014) – Rie Azuma
 A Stitch of Life (2015)
 First Gentleman (2021) – prime minister Rinko Sōma
 The Legend and Butterfly (2023) – Kagamino

Television
 Under One Roof (1993) – Aiko Mifune
 Oda Nobunaga (1998) – No-Hime
  (1999)
 Keizoku (1999) – Jun Shibata
 Eien no Ko (2000) – Yuki Kusaka
 Manatsu no Merry Christmas (2000) – Haru Hoshino
 Prince Shotoku (2001) – Tojiko no Iratsume
 R-17 (2001)
 Otosan (2002)
 Believe (2002)
 Jin (2009) – Miki Tomonaga/Nokaze 
 Beautiful Rain (2012) – Akane Nishiwaki
 Gunshi Kanbei (2014) – Teru
 Ghostwriter (2015) – Risa Tono
 IQ246 (2016) – Tomomi Morimoto
 Kataomoi (2017)
 Followers (2020) – Limi Nara

Discography

Albums
 Shokumotsu Rensa (1996) produced by Ryuichi Sakamoto
 Cure (1997) produced by Ryuichi Sakamoto
 Vague (Remix album) (1997) produced by Ryuichi Sakamoto
 Absolute Value (Best album) (1998) produced by Ryuichi Sakamoto
 Shiseikatsu (1999) produced by Ryuichi Sakamoto
 Pure Best (Best album limited edition) (2001) produced by Ryuichi Sakamoto
 Miki (Best album from Warner Music Japan) (2001) produced by Ryuichi Sakamoto

Singles
 "Mind Circus" (1996) composed and arranged by Ryuichi Sakamoto
 "Strange Paradise" (1996) composed and arranged by Ryuichi Sakamoto
 "Suna no Kajitsu" (1997) composed and arranged by Ryuichi Sakamoto
 "Wilder Than Heaven" (1997) composed and arranged by Ryuichi Sakamoto
 "Ibara no Kanmuri" (1997) composed and arranged by Ryuichi Sakamoto
 "Chronic Love" (1999) composed and arranged by Ryuichi Sakamoto
 "Frontier" (1999) composed and arranged by Ryuichi Sakamoto
 "Kowareta Kokoro" (2000) composed and arranged by Ryuichi Sakamoto
 "Air Pocket" (2001) composed and arranged by Ryuichi Sakamoto

Videos
 Butterfish (1997)
 Completeness (1998)
 Air Pocket (2002)

DVDs
 Butterfish (2000)
 Kowareta Kokoro (2000)
 Air Pocket (2002)

References

External links

 
 
 
 

 

1976 births
Living people
Japanese women pop singers
Japanese idols
20th-century Japanese women singers
20th-century Japanese singers
People from Higashimurayama, Tokyo
20th-century Japanese actresses
21st-century Japanese actresses
Stardust Promotion artists
Best Actress Asian Film Award winners